The Chairman of the Council of People's Commissars of the Soviet Union was the head of government of the Soviet Union during the existence of the Council of People's Commissars of the Soviet Union from 1923 to 1946.

History
The post of chair of the Council of People's Commissars of the Soviet Union – the head of the executive body of the Central Executive Committee of the Soviet Union – was established by the Treaty on the Formation of the Union of Soviet Socialist Republics, which entered into force after approval by the First Congress of Soviets at a meeting on 30 December 1922. The first chairman of the Council of People's Commissars of the Soviet Union was appointed to the post at the 2nd session of the Central Executive Committee of the Soviet Union on 6 July 1923.

1923–1930
The appointment of Vladimir Lenin to the post of the first chair of the Council of People's Commissars of the Soviet Union on 6 July 1923, was of purely symbolic significance, since Lenin's poor state of health did not allow him to actively engage in public affairs and since May 1923 he had been left without a break in the Gorky residence near Moscow under the supervision of doctors. Before the death of Lenin in 1924, the actual leadership of the Council of People's Commissars of the Soviet Union was carried out by Alexei Rykov.

Having replaced Lenin as head of government, Alexei Rykov actively pursued a New Economic Policy and in the late 1920s opposed its curtailment. Together with Nikolai Bukharin and Mikhail Tomsky, he opposed Stalin in a discussion about collectivization and against forcing industrialization, opposed the adoption of a five-year economic development planning system, which caused dissatisfaction with the party elite. Joseph Stalin told the writer Maxim Gorky: "We are thinking of changing Rykov, he is getting confused at the feet!", to which Rykov directly told Stalin: "Your policy does not smell like an economy!". In the fall of 1929, he publicly admitted his "mistakes", losing to Stalin.

In 1924–1929, Rykov, simultaneously with the post of head of government of the Soviet Union, served as chairman of the Council of People's Commissars of the Russian Socialist Federative Soviet Republic. In December 1930, he was removed from the post of chairman of the Council of People's Commissars of the Soviet Union and was soon appointed People's Commissar of Posts and Telegraphs of the Soviet Union.

1930–1941

The place of Alexey Rykov as chairman of the Council of People's Commissars of the Soviet Union was taken by Vyacheslav Molotov, who held this position for the longest term (more than 10 years) and combined the post of head of government with other positions: chairman of the Council of Labor and Defense, Defense Committee, Economic Council under the Council People's Commissars of the Soviet Union, and since 1939 – People's Commissar of Foreign Affairs of the Soviet Union.

On 6 May 1941, Molotov was relieved of his post as chairman of the Council of People's Commissars of the Soviet Union, taking the post of deputy head of government. The official reason for Molotov's resignation was his many requests, motivated by the difficulty to fulfill the duties of head of government along with the duties of the People's Commissar of Foreign Affairs. According to some historians, the real reasons for the removal of Molotov from the leadership of the government were Joseph Stalin's personal dislike and the latter's decision to take the post of chairman of the Council of People's Commissars of the Soviet Union to concentrate the party and executive state power in a difficult international situation on the eve of Germany's invasion of the Soviet Union.

1941–1946
During the Great Patriotic War, from 30 June 1941, to 4 September 1945, all power in the Soviet Union belonged to the State Defense Committee of the Soviet Union under the leadership of Joseph Stalin, who during this period combined the position of chairman of the State Defense Committee of the Soviet Union with posts Chairman of the Council of People's Commissars of the Soviet Union and People's Commissar of Defense. During the war, the activities of the People's Commissariats of the Soviet Union were subordinate to the State Committee of Defense of the Soviet Union, which did not have its own apparatus and relied on the administrative resources of the People's Commissariats.

By a decree of the State Defense Committee on 15 October 1941, the Council of People's Commissars of the Soviet Union, together with other bodies of state power and administration, was evacuated to the city of Kuibyshev, however, Joseph Stalin, being the chairman of the State Committee of Defense of the Soviet Union and the Headquarters of the Supreme High Command, remained in Moscow.

In 1946, in connection with the transformation of the Council of People's Commissars of the Soviet Union into the Council of Ministers of the Soviet Union, the post of head of the government of the Soviet Union was changed to "Chairman of the Council of Ministers of the Soviet Union".

List of chairmen of the Council of People's Commissars of the Soviet Union and their deputies
Here are lists of chairmen of the Council of People's Commissars of the Soviet Union, first deputies and vice-chairmen of the Council of People's Commissars of the Soviet Union. The list of chairmen of the Council of People's Commissars of the Soviet Union is given in chronological order. For each chairman, alphabetical lists of his first deputies and deputies are given. Dates of a person's position are indicated in parentheses.

References

See also
Council of People's Commissars of the Soviet Union
Premier of the Soviet Union

Soviet Union-related lists